Chiromachla torbeni is a moth of the  family Erebidae. It is found in Saudi Arabia and Yemen.

References

Nyctemerina
Moths of the Middle East
Moths described in 1983